Walk on the Water is an album by American jazz saxophonist Gerry Mulligan and His Orchestra featuring performances recorded in 1980 and first released on the DRG label. In 1982, the album received the Grammy Award for Best Large Jazz Ensemble Album.

Reception

AllMusic awarded the album 4 stars with its review by Scott Yanow stating, "Baritonist Gerry Mulligan has had few opportunities to record with a big band since his Concert Jazz Band broke up in 1963, a real pity considering how talented a composer and arranger he has been. This DRG release features a strong orchestra performing several of Jeru's compositions".

Track listing
All compositions by Gerry Mulligan except where noted.
 "For an Unfinished Woman" – 7:13
 "Song for Strayhorn" – 6:08
 "Forty Second and Broadway" – 5:07
 "Angelica" (Mitchel Forman) – 6:25
 "Walk on the Water" – 4:24
 "Across the Track Blues" (Duke Ellington) – 3:10
 "I'm Getting Sentimental Over You" (George Bassman, Ned Washington) – 6:06

Personnel
 Gerry Mulligan – baritone saxophone (tracks 1, 2, 4, 6 & 7), soprano saxophone (tracks 3 & 5), arranger
 Laurie Frink, Barry Ries, Tom Harrell, Mike Davis, Danny Hayes – trumpet
 Keith O'Quinn, Dave Glenn, Alan Raph – trombone
 Eric Turkel, Gerry Niewood, Ken Hitchcock – alto saxophone
 Gary Keller, Ralph Olson, Seth Brody – tenor saxophone
 Joe Temperley – baritone saxophone
 Mitchel Forman – piano
 Jay Leonhart, Mike Bocchicchio (track 1) – double bass
 Richard DeRosa – drums
 Tom Fay – arranger (track 1)

References

Gerry Mulligan albums
1980 albums
Grammy Award for Best Large Jazz Ensemble Album